The Falls Incline Railway, originally known as the Horseshoe Falls Incline is a type of funicular railway (an inclined elevator) in the city of Niagara Falls, Ontario, Canada. It is located beside Niagara Falls at the Horseshoe Falls. The line was built in 1966 for the Niagara Parks Commission by the Swiss company Von Roll. It adopted its current name in the 1980s.  Originally built with open-air cars, it was rebuilt in 2013 with enclosed cars to permit year-round operation.

Unlike the other incline railways at Niagara Falls, the Falls Incline was not built to descend into the Niagara Gorge below the falls. Instead it links the Table Rock Centre and Journey Behind the Falls, on the Niagara Parkway just above the falls to the higher level Fallsview Tourist Area, including the Minolta Tower, the Niagara Fallsview Casino Resort and several hotels.

The Niagara Parks Commission claims that the funicular is the world's slowest.

The funicular has the following technical parameters:

Length: 
Slope: 30 degrees
Cars: 2
Capacity: 40 passengers per car
Configuration: Double track
Maximum speed: 
Journey time: 62 seconds
Track gauge: 
Traction: Electricity

See also
 Incline railways at Niagara Falls
 List of funicular railways

References

External links
 
 Falls Incline web page
 Images from the Niagara Falls Public Library (Ont.)

Funicular railways in Canada
Passenger railways in Ontario
Railway lines opened in 1966
Transport in Niagara Falls, Ontario
6 ft gauge railways in Canada
Tourist attractions in Niagara Falls, Ontario
Railway inclines in Canada
Niagara Parks Commission